Richard Milton may refer to:
Richard Milton (author), wrote The Facts of Life: Shattering the Myths of Darwinism
Richard Milton (swimmer) (born 1965), Swedish swimmer